Bostra claveriei is a species of snout moth in the genus Bostra. It was described by Rougeot in 1977, and is known from Ethiopia.

References

Pyralini
Moths described in 1977
Moths of Africa